The individual freestyle test, grade Ia, para-equestrian dressage event at the 2016 Summer Paralympics was contested on the afternoon of 15 September 2016 at the Olympic Equestrian Centre in Rio de Janeiro.

The competition was assessed by a ground jury composed of five judges placed at locations designated E, H, C, M, and B. Each judge rated the competitors' performances with a percentage score. The five scores from the jury were then averaged to determine a rider's total percentage score.

Ground jury

Results

References 

Individual championship test grade Ia